Anima mundi is a Latin phrase meaning "the soul of the world"

Anima Mundi may also refer to:

Anima Mundi (film), a 1992 documentary film directed by Godfrey Reggio
Anima Mundi (event), a Brazilian video and film festival
Animamundi: Dark Alchemist, a 2002 game by Hirameki International
Anima Mundi (band), a Cuban progressive rock band
Anima Mundi (album), the second album by Dionysus
Anima Mundi, Vatican City, an ethnographic museum